Vera Celis (born 6 August 1959 in Turnhout) is a Belgian politician and is affiliated to the N-VA. She was elected as a member of the Flemish Parliament in 2009.

Notes

Living people
Members of the Flemish Parliament
New Flemish Alliance politicians
1959 births
People from Turnhout
21st-century Belgian politicians
21st-century Belgian women politicians